Billion is a name for a large number. It may refer specifically to:

 1,000,000,000 (one thousand million), the short scale definition
 1,000,000,000,000 (one million million), the long scale definition

Billion may also refer to: 
 Billions (TV series), a Showtime series
 Billions (film), a 1920 silent comedy
 Billion (company), a Taiwanese modem manufacturer
 Jack Billion (1939-2023), American politician
 Mr. Billion, a 1977 film by Jonathan Kaplan
 "Billions" (song), a song on Russell Dickerson's album Yours
 "Billions", a song by Caroline Polachek
 "Billion", a song by Cardiacs from Sing to God

See also
 Long and short scales
 Names of large numbers
 Billion laughs, an XML parser vulnerability
 Golden billion, a Russian term for the wealthy people of the developed world
 Billon (disambiguation)
 BN (disambiguation)